The New England Telephone and Telegraph Company was a very early, short lived company set up to develop the then-new telephone. It should not be confused with the New England Telephone and Telegraph Company that was formed a year later and was one of the largest of the regional Bell Telephone Companies. 

New England Telephone and Telegraph lasted only a year as a separate entity, from 1878 to 1879, and had no direct relationship with the later company of the same name, which after the breakup of the Bell System in 1984 became part of the NYNEX Corporation, now part of Verizon.

History 

The New England Telephone and Telegraph Company was formed February 12, 1878, by investors in the states of Massachusetts and Rhode Island at the behest of an agent of Gardiner Greene Hubbard, the father-in-law of telephone inventor Alexander Graham Bell.

New England Telephone and Telegraph merged with the Bell Telephone Company (which was started on the basis of holding "potentially valuable patents"), on February 17, 1879, to form the National Bell Telephone Company, at which time Theodore Vail took over its operations. The National Bell Telephone Company merged with others on March 20, 1880, to form the American Bell Telephone Company.

Later acquisition of American Bell by AT&T 

The American Bell Telephone Company was later purchased by its own subsidiary, American Telephone & Telegraph (AT&T) on December 30, 1899. Thus share ownership of New England Telephone and Telegraph evolved into ownership of AT&T. AT&T would later undergo mergers with SBC Communications and BellSouth to become The New AT&T.

See also 

 The Bell System, a name and trademark formerly used by AT&T.
 The Regional Bell Operating Companies, which were divested from the Bell System in 1984.

References 

Notes

Bibliography

 Bruce, Robert V. Bell: Alexander Bell and the Conquest of Solitude. Ithaca, New York: Cornell University Press, 1990. .
 Pizer, Russell A. The Tangled Web of Patent #174465, AuthorHouse, 2009, .

Further reading 
 New England Telephone and Telegraph Co. List of Subscribers, October 1, 1889; and business directory. Boston: 1889.
 New England Telephone and Telegraph Co., Boston Division Official List of Subscribers, July 1st, 1890. [Boston?]: 1890. 
 Tossiello, Rosario. "The Birth and Early Years Of The Bell Telephone System, 1876–1880" (dissertation), Boston University, 1971.
 Larned, Larry. Birth of The Blue Bell Telephone Signs: The History of the Blue Bell Telephone Sign as implemented by New England Telephone and Telegraph, BellTelephoneSigns.com website, February 26, 2007. Retrieved January 12, 2010.

Bell System
History of New England
Telegraph companies of the United States
Alexander Graham Bell 
Telecommunications companies established in 1878
Defunct telecommunications companies of the United States